Tony Analau (born 16 May 1969) is a retired weightlifter who represented the Solomon Islands.

Analau competed in the weightlifting at the 1996 Summer Olympics which were held in Atlanta, he entered the 64 kg division, but was unable to lift his starting weight of 80 kg, so he didn't finish the event.

References

External links
 

1969 births
Living people
Solomon Islands male weightlifters
Olympic weightlifters of the Solomon Islands
Weightlifters at the 1996 Summer Olympics